100 or one hundred (Roman numeral: C) is the natural number following 99 and preceding 101.

In medieval contexts, it may be described as the short hundred or five score in order to differentiate the English and Germanic use of "hundred" to describe the long hundred of six score or 120.

In mathematics
100 is the square of 10 (in scientific notation it is written as 102). The standard SI prefix for a hundred is "hecto-". 

100 is the basis of percentages (per cent meaning "per hundred" in Latin), with 100% being a full amount.

100 is a Harshad number in decimal, and also in base-four, a base in-which it is also a self-descriptive number.

100 is the sum of the first nine prime numbers, from 2 through 23. It is also divisible by the number of primes below it, 25. 

100 cannot be expressed as the difference between any integer and the total of coprimes below it, making it a noncototient.

100 has a reduced totient of 20, and an Euler totient of 40. A totient value of 100 is obtained from four numbers: 101, 125, 202, and 250.

100 can be expressed as a sum of some of its divisors, making it a semiperfect number. The geometric mean of its nine divisors is 10.

100 is the sum of the cubes of the first four positive integers (100 = 13 + 23 + 33 + 43). This is related by Nicomachus's theorem to the fact that 100 also equals the square of the sum of the first four positive integers: .

100 = 26 + 62, thus 100 is the seventh Leyland number. 100 is also the seventeenth Erdős–Woods number, and the fourth 18-gonal number.

There are exactly 100 prime numbers in base-ten whose digits are in strictly ascending order (e.g. 239, 2357 etc.). The last such prime number is 23456789, which contains eight consecutive integers as digits.

In science
One hundred is the atomic number of fermium, an actinide and the last of the heavy metals that can be created through neutron bombardment.

On the Celsius scale, 100 degrees is the boiling temperature of pure water at sea level.

The Kármán line lies at an altitude of 100 kilometres above the Earth's sea level and is commonly used to define the boundary between Earth's atmosphere and outer space.

In religion
There are 100 blasts of the Shofar heard in the service of Rosh Hashana, the Jewish New Year.
A religious Jew is expected to utter at least 100 blessings daily.
In the Hindu epic of the Mahabharata, the king Dhritarashtra had 100 sons known as the Kauravas.

In politics
 The Hundred (county division) is a largely historical division of a county or similar larger administrative unit.
 The United States Senate has 100 Senators.

In money

Most of the world's currencies are divided into 100 subunits; for example, one euro is one hundred cents and one pound sterling is one hundred pence.

By specification, 100 euro notes feature a picture of a Rococo gateway on the obverse and a Baroque bridge on the reverse.

The U.S. hundred-dollar bill has Benjamin Franklin's portrait; the "Benjamin" is the largest U.S. bill in print. American savings bonds of $100 have Thomas Jefferson's portrait, while American $100 treasury bonds have Andrew Jackson's portrait.

In other fields
One hundred is also:

 The number of years in a century.
 The number of centimeters in a meter.
 The number of pounds in an American short hundredweight.
 In Greece, India, Israel and Nepal, 100 is the police telephone number.
 In Belgium, 100 is the ambulance and firefighter telephone number.
 In United Kingdom, 100 is the operator telephone number.
 The HTTP status code indicating that the client should continue with its request.
 The age at which a person becomes a centenarian.

In sports
 The number of yards in an American football field (not including the end zones).
 The number of points required for a snooker player to score a century break, a significant milestone.
 The record number of points scored in one NBA game by a single player, set by Wilt Chamberlain of the Philadelphia Warriors on March 2, 1962.
 The 100-yard dash and the 100-metre dash are sprint track events.
 The 100-kilometre walk is a racewalking event.
 The Hundred (cricket), a 100-ball cricket competition.

See also

 1 vs. 100
 AFI's 100 Years...
 Hundred (division)
 Hundred (word)
 Hundred Days
 Hundred Years' War
 List of highways numbered 100
 Top 100
 Greatest 100

References 

 Wells, D. The Penguin Dictionary of Curious and Interesting Numbers London: Penguin Group. (1987): 133

External links

Integers